John Lavelle may refer to:

 John W. Lavelle (1949–2007), member of the New York State Assembly
 John Lavelle (actor) (born 1981), American actor
 John D. Lavelle (1916–1979), U.S. Air Force general